Anoop Jacob (born 16 December 1977) is an Indian politician and a Member of the Kerala Legislative Assembly and Legislative Party leader of the Kerala Congress (Jacob), a constituent of the UDF political alliance. He is the son of T. M. Jacob who founded the party in 1993. Anoop represents Piravom Constituency in Kerala Legislative Assembly. He was elected to the Assembly following a by-election at Piravom in March 2012 which was necessitated due to the demise of his father, the incumbent of the constituency. He was elected in May 2016 also. In 2021 election Anoop was elected from the same constituency with a highest majority.

Education

Anoop Jacob has a degree from Kerala Law Academy Law College, Thiruvananthapuram and is a practising lawyer at the Kerala High Court. Prior to that he completed his Bachelors in English Literature from Mar Ivanios College, Thiruvananthapuram.

Politics

His first foray into politics was as a student at the Mar Ivanios College where he founded a unit of Kerala Students Congress (Jacob) in 1994. In 1997, he was elected as editor of the college union magazine, Prathibha, which won the Malayala Manorama award for the state's best college magazine under his aegis. In 1998, he unsuccessfully contested the post of Chairman of the Mar Ivanios College Union.

Anoop became State President of the Kerala Students Congress (Jacob) in 2001, during which period the party registered its best performance yet by winning seats including General Secretary & Councillor in colleges like Mar Ivanios. In 2008, he was elected as the State President of the Kerala Youth Front (Jacob), the youth wing of the Kerala Congress (Jacob) party.

Election to Kerala Legislative Assembly

Anoop's father, who was the Minister for Food and Civil Supplies, died on 30 October 2011. Following this, Anoop was nominated by the Kerala Congress (Jacob) and UDF to contest from the Piravom assembly seat previously represented by his father. His father had lost the sitting seat in 2006 elections and recaptured it in 2011 election by a margin of 157 votes.

Against Anoop Jacob, CPI(M)led LDF once again fielded M. J. Jacob, who had won against T. M. Jacob in 2006 and lost in 2011. Since the result of Piravom by-election mattered heavily to the ruling UDF who had a slender margin of 1 seat in the Legislative assembly over LDF, the constituency witnessed intense campaigning from both sides. Election was held on 17 March 2012 and results were announced on 21 March 2012. Anoop Jacob won the by-election by a significant margin of 12,071 votes. He was sworn in as an MLA on 22 March 2012. Anoop took oath as the Minister for Food & Civil Supplies on 12 April 2012 and occupied office in the North Block of the Kerala Secretariat; both portfolio & office last held by his departed father.

Personal life

Anoop Jacob married Anila Geevarghese on 23 May 2002. She is working as Asst. Professor, BPC college, Piravom. They have a son and a daughter. Apart from politics, he is passionate about reading and poetry.

References

1977 births
Living people
People from Muvattupuzha
Kerala MLAs 2011–2016
Kerala MLAs 2016–2021
Malayali politicians
Kerala politicians